The Barada is the main river that flows through Damascus, the capital of Syria.

Barada may also mean:

 Barada, a brand of beer brewed in Damascus – see Beer in Syria
 Barada, Nebraska. a village in the US State of Nebraska
 Baradha people, an Aboriginal Australian people of Queensland, also spelt Barada
 Barada TV, a London-based Syrian opposition satellite television station

In fiction
 The second word in the phrase Klaatu barada nikto from the 1951 science fiction film The Day the Earth Stood Still
 Barada (Star Wars), a fictional character in the Star Wars universe